Somme-Suippe is a commune in the Marne department in north-eastern France.

Geography
The Suippe river has its source in the commune.

See also
Communes of the Marne department

References

Sommesuippe